Laila Wasti is a Pakistani actress and director. She is known for her roles in dramas Qurban, Dil Ruba, Daldal, Hum Kahan Ke Sachay Thay, Sun Yaara and Dunk.

Early life
Laila was born on 3 June 1977 in Karachi, Pakistan. She completed her studies from Saint Joseph Convent, she graduated with English Literature. Then she went abroad to America. She studied at University of California, Los Angeles, she did masters in filmmaking. Laila's mother Tahira Wasti  and father Rizwan Wasti were actors.

Career
Laila started acting on PTV in 1990s. She was noted for her roles in dramas Eaitraf, Pukaar, Saibaan, Operation Dwarka 1965, Heer Waris Shah and Eendhan, Badlon Par Basera. She also appeared in dramas Sun Yaara along with Junaid Khan, Hira Mani also with Zarnish Khan and Qismat with Minal Khan and Zhalay Sarhadi. Since then she appeared in dramas Sangar, Qurban, Teri Meri Kahani, Bharam, Daldal and Dunk.

Personal life
Laila and Fahad married on 27 December 2008. They have one child together. Shortly after her marriage she was diagnosed with leukemia. After 6-7 years of painful treatment, she finally survived cancer. Laila's father Rizwan Wasti died in 2011 and her mother Tahira Wasti died in 2012. She has two older brothers Rehan Wasti and Adnan Wasti. Laila's cousin's Maria Wasti is also an actress.

Filmography

Television

Telefilm

Film

Awards and nominations

References

External links
 
 

1977 births
Living people
Pakistani television actresses
Pakistani film actresses
Punjabi people
20th-century Pakistani actresses
21st-century Pakistani actresses